Santa Fe No. 5000 is a 2-10-4 "Texas" type steam locomotive constructed by Baldwin Locomotive Works in 1930 for the Atchison, Topeka and Santa Fe Railway. No. 5000 was immediately nicknamed the "Madame Queen" and remained a unique member of its own class. It was donated to the City of Amarillo, Texas in 1957 and is currently maintained by the Railroad Artifact Preservation Society. Santa Fe 5000 is on the National Register of Historic Places.

Construction
The Texas type on the Santa Fe is by design a Berkshire with an additional driving axle, as it was ordered by most railroads.  Although Santa Fe 3829 was the first steam locomotive with the 2-10-4 wheel arrangement, Santa Fe 5000 served as the prototype for all further 2-10-4 locomotives used by the railroad.

In 1930, Santa Fe looked at the contemporary heavy-duty motive power policies of other railroads and decided that its own needed substantial reappraisal.  Additional locomotives were ordered as a result of this study, including the 5000.  Santa Fe 5000 was placed in service between Clovis and Vaughn, New Mexico for observation.  The result was that the company had purchased a locomotive which would pull 15% more tonnage in 9% less time, burning 17% less coal per 1000 gross ton-miles than its 3800 series 2-10-2s.

Although the locomotive was a success, the 1930s brought the national depression and Santa Fe adopted a policy of avoiding capital expenditures during this period.  By the time the next 2-10-4s were delivered in 1938 they were placed in a different class because of many design refinements.  With the various classes of 4-8-4 types, the 2-10-4 type represented the pinnacle of modern heavy-power development on the Santa Fe Railway System.

Modifications
Santa Fe 5000 underwent few modifications during its service life.  It received a larger 'square tender', which required the cab roof to be modified with an area that allowed crew members to pass from the cab to the top of the tender.  In 1940 the locomotive was converted from coal to oil fuel.

Preservation
It was placed on outdoor static display at the Santa Fe station. In August 2005, 5000 was moved by the Railroad Artifact Preservation Society to a new location in Amarillo, 500 SE 2nd Avenue, where it plans to construct a building to house and preserve the locomotive. In July 2016, the city of Amarillo proposed selling the locomotive.

See also

National Register of Historic Places listings in Potter County, Texas

References

Bibliography

External links 

1979 Article on the Madame Queen (updated 11/10/2011)
Article on putting the Madame Queen on the Nat. Register of Historic Places (updated 11/10/2011)
Railroad Artifact Preservation Society of Amarillo, TX

5000
2-10-4 locomotives
Baldwin locomotives
Individual locomotives of the United States
Railway locomotives on the National Register of Historic Places
Railway locomotives introduced in 1930
Freight locomotives
Historic districts on the National Register of Historic Places in Texas
National Register of Historic Places in Potter County, Texas
Standard gauge locomotives of the United States
Rail transportation on the National Register of Historic Places in Texas
Preserved steam locomotives of Texas